The Valencian Pilota Squad are the Valencian pilota professional or amateur players chosen to take part in the Handball International Championships representing Spain, even though all of them are Valencians and they use the Valencian flag, .

This is the list of the players:

2007 Valencian Squad 
Handball International Championships, 2007
 picture
 Coach: Pigat II of El Genovés
 David of Petrer, amateur
 Ferdi of Godelleta, amateur
 Héctor of Meliana, amateur
 Jan of Murla, amateur
 Màlia I of La Vall de Laguar
 Mario of El Campello, amateur
 Martínez of El Campello, amateur
 Nacho of Beniparrell, amateur
 Pasqual of La Pobla de Vallbona
 Santi of Finestrat, amateur

Trophies 
 Winner of International game
 Runner-up of Llargues
 Absolute champion

Blog 
  Tagarinet's weblog supporting the Selecció at Belgium

2006 Valencian Squad 
 Coach: Pigat II of El Genovés
 Álvaro of Faura
 Dani of La Nucia, amateur
 David of Petrer, amateur
 Genovés II of El Genovés
 Martínez of El Campello, amateur
 Pasqual of La Pobla de Vallbona
 Raül II of Godelleta
 Santi of Finestrat, amateur
 Tato of Altea

2005 Valencian Squad 
 Coach: Pigat II of El Genovés

2004 Valencian Squad 
 Coach: Pigat II of El Genovés
 Álvaro of Faura
 Dani of La Nucia, amateur
 David of Petrer, amateur
 Emilio, amateur
 Jan of Murla, amateur
 Genovés I of El Genovés
 Grau of València
 Jan of Murla
 León of El Genovés
 Màlia of La Vall de Laguar, amateur
 Martínez of El Campello, amateur
 Santi of Finestrat, amateur
 Sarasol II of El Genovés

Trophies 
 Llargues World champion

2003 Valencian Squad 
 Coach: Pigat II of El Genovés
 Álvaro of Faura
 David of Petrer, amateur
 Grau of València
 Jan of Murla, amateur
 Màlia of La Vall de Laguar, amateur
 Martínez of El Campello, amateur
 Santi of Finestrat, amateur
 Sarasol II of El Genovés

Trophies 
 International fronton European champion
 International game European champion
 Llargues European runner-up

2002 Valencian Squad 
 Coach: Viñes
 Álvaro of Faura
 Grau of València
 Màlia of La Vall de Laguar, amateur
 Martínez of El Campello
 Pigat II of El Genovés
 Santi of Finestrat, amateur
 Sarasol II of El Genovés, best player
 Vicente of Alaquàs

Trophies 
 International fronton World champion
 International game World champion
 Llargues World champion

2001 Valencian Squad 
 Coach: Viñes
 Dani of Benavites
 David of Petrer, amateur
 Esteban, amateur
 Grau of València
 Jan of Murla, amateur
 Martínez of El Campello, amateur
 Sarasol I of El Genovés
 Sarasol II of El Genovés

Trophies 
 International fronton European champion
 International game European champion
 Llargues European runner-up

2000 Valencian Squad 
 Coach: Viñes
 Dani of Benavites
 David of Petrer, amateur
 Grau of València
 Jan of Murla, amateur
 Màlia of La Vall de Laguar, amateur
 Martínez of El Campello, amateur
 Mengual, amateur
 Mezquita of Vila-real
 Montesa, amateur
 Paco, amateur
 Pigat II of El Genovés
 Sarasol I of El Genovés
 Sarasol II of El Genovés
 Víctor of València
 Waldo of Oliva

Trophies 
 Llargues World champion

1999 Valencian Squad 
 Coach: Viñes
 David of Petrer, amateur
 Grau of València, best player
 Jan of Murla, amateur
 Martínez of El Campello
 Mengual, amateur
 Pigat II of El Genovés
 Puchol of Vinalesa
 Sarasol I of El Genovés
 Sarasol II of El Genovés

Trophies 
 Llargues European champion

1998 Valencian Squad 
 Coach: Vicent Alzina
 Fredi of València
 Grau of València, best player
 Martínez of El Campello
 Mezquita of Vila-real
 Pedro of València
 Pigat II of El Genovés
 Puchol of Vinalesa
 Sarasol I of El Genovés
 Sarasol II of El Genovés
 Tino of València

Trophies 
 Llargues World champion

1997 Valencian Squad 
 Coach: Vicent Alzina
 Fredi of València
 Grau of València
 Martínez of El Campello, amateur
 Pigat II of El Genovés
 Sarasol I of El Genovés
 Sarasol II of El Genovés

1996 Valencian Squad 
 Coach: Vicent Alzina
 Edi
 Fredi of València
 Genovés I of El Genovés
 Grau of València
 Mezquita of Vila-real
 Paco, amateur
 Pigat II of El Genovés
 Puchol of Vinalesa
 Sarasol I of El Genovés
 Sarasol II of El Genovés

Trophies 
 Llargues World champion

1995 Valencian Squad 
 Coach: Vicent Alzina

1994 Valencian Squad 
 Coach: Vicent Alzina
 Edi
 Genovés I of El Genovés
 Grau of València
 Màlia of La Vall de Laguar, amateur
 Pigat II of El Genovés
 Sarasol II of El Genovés
 Tonico of Murla, amateur

Trophies 
 International game European runner-up
 Llargues European runner-up

1993 Valencian Squad 
 Coach: Vicent Alzina
 Florencio of Altea, amateur
 Genovés I of El Genovés
 Grau of València
 Pigat I of El Genovés
 Sarasol I of El Genovés, best player
 Sarasol II of El Genovés
 Tonico of Murla, amateur

Trophies 
 Llargues champion

External links 
 2007 Valencian Squad

Valencian pilota
Pilotaris from the Valencian Community